The 2006–07 Niagara Purple Eagles men's basketball team represented Niagara University during the 2006–07 NCAA Division I men's basketball season. The Purple Eagles, led by ninth-year head coach Joe Mihalich, played their home games at the Gallagher Center in Lewiston, New York as members of the Metro Atlantic Athletic Conference. They finished the season 23–12, 13–5 in MAAC play to finish in second place. They defeated Rider, Loyola, and Siena to win the MAAC tournament and secure the conferences automatic bid to the NCAA Tournament as one of two 16 seeds in the West region. The Purple Eagles defeated , 77–69, in the Play-in Game to reach the field of 64 where No. 1 seed Kansas dominated Niagara by the score of 107–67.

Roster

Schedule and results

|-
!colspan=9 style=| Regular season

|-
!colspan=9 style=| MAAC tournament

|-
!colspan=9 style=| NCAA tournament

Source

References

Niagara Purple Eagles men's basketball seasons
Niagara
Niagara